Wenona School is an independent, secular, day and boarding school for girls, located in the Sydney suburb of North Sydney, in New South Wales, Australia.

Founded by Miss Edith Hooke in 1886 as Woodstock School, Wenona has a non-selective enrolment policy and currently caters for approximately 1,000 students from Kindergarten to Year 12, including 50 boarders in Years 7 to 12.

The school is affiliated with the Independent Primary School Heads of Australia (IPSHA), the Australian Boarding Schools' Association (ABSA), the Alliance of Girls' Schools Australasia (AGSA), and the Association of Heads of Independent Girls' Schools (AHIGS).

History
Woodstock School was founded in 1886 by Miss Edith Hooke who was prominent in educational circles at the time. Miss Hooke selected the motto Ut Prosim, that I may serve, which she transferred to Wenona School in April 1913, a preparatory school with the same colours and crest and an enrolment of 40 which she established in place of Woodstock. The close relationship between the schools is reflected in the name Wenona, thought to have been chosen by Miss Hooke, a devotee of Longfellow, from his poem The Song of Hiawatha, in which Wenonah is a first-born daughter.

When Miss Hooke left the school in February 1920 due to an illness in her family, Ms Messiter, a former pupil of Woodstock, stepped in to watch over the school. By June of that year, another former Woodstock student, Miss Edith Ralston, became Principal and owner. In 1922, she moved the school to its current site in Walker Street, North Sydney, through the purchase of an extensive property, and opened the school's first boarding house. In the following years, Miss Ralston extended Wenona into a large and successful school for girls, with a curriculum providing for students from Kindergarten to Year 12.

Principals 
The following individuals have served as Principal of Wenona School:

Campus
Straddling Miller and Walker streets in North Sydney, Wenona comprises a junior school (K to Year 6), including Woodstock Infants and Hooke Primary, a middle school (Year 7 to Year 9) and a senior college (Year 10 to Year 12). Up to 50 boarders are housed in the heritage Messiter and Ralston houses.  
An evening study centre is staffed by teachers four evenings a week for senior college students.
Sporting facilities include a Gymnasium including cricket nets, a tennis court and many more courts and indoor fields; a smaller gymnasium catering to dance and circuit activities; a 25-metre indoor swimming pool; and a weights room.

Curriculum

Junior school
Key learning areas include English, Mathematics, Science and Technology, Human Society and its Environment (HSIE), Language Other Than English (LOTE), Creative and Performing Arts, and Personal Development, Health and Physical Education (PDHPE).
At Wenona, Mandarin is compulsory from Kindergarten to Year 6 and French from Year 3 to Year 6.
Integration of Information and Communication Technologies(ICT) across the curriculum is a focus.

Middle school
Subject offerings, which reflect student interest and demand, change from time to time.
Girls in Year 7 and Year 8 follow a curriculum largely determined by the NSW Board of Studies in preparation for the NSW School Certificate. Subjects include: English, Geography, History, Mathematics, Science, and Personal Development, Health and Physical Education (PDHPE).
Board requirements in Languages other than English (LOTE), Visual Arts, Music and Technology are also met.
At Wenona, girls study Asian (Mandarin and Japanese)and European (French, German and Spanish) languages.
From Year 9, Wenona offers the following electives: Commerce, Drama, elective History, Philosophy, French, German, Japanese, Mandarin, Music, Photographic and Digital Media, Physical Activity and Sports Studies (PASS), Psychology, Design and Technology- Applied STEM, Textiles technology and Visual Arts.

Senior college
Subject offerings, which reflect student interest and demand, change from time to time.
Girls in Year 10 must study English, History, Geography, Mathematics, Science, and Personal Development, Health and Physical Education (PDHPE). Electives include Commerce, Drama, French, German, Japanese, Mandarin, Music, Photographic and Digital Media, Psychology, Textiles technology, Visual Arts, and Physical Activity and Sports Studies (PASS).
Higher School Certificate elective subjects for Years 11 and 12 at Wenona include: Ancient History, Biology, Business Studies, Chemistry, Design and Technology, Drama, Earth and Environmental Science, Economics, English, French (continuers), General Mathematics, Geography, German (continuers), Japanese (beginners and continuers), Legal Studies, Chinese (beginners), Aboriginal Studies, 
Mathematics, Modern History, Music 1, Music 2, Personal Development, Health and Physical Education (PDHPE), Physics, Senior Science, Software Design and Development, Studies of Religion (1 and 2 unit), Textiles and Design, Visual Arts and Visual Design (non-ATAR).
Extension courses are available in mathematics, English, Music, History and Languages. Girls may also study HSC languages through the Open High School or the Saturday School of Community Languages.
Enrichment and extension, including some subject acceleration and university Distinction courses, are available to students who will benefit, along with a residential HSC study camp for Year 12 girls and a range of cultural exchange programs.

Co-curriculum

Music
Music is compulsory in a number of junior and middle school years and for elective music students in Year 9 to Year 12. Music groups include vocal ensemble, senior choir, middle school choir, junior choir, infants choir, contemporary vocal group and petite voices. There are three rock bands which perform in an annual rock concert combining dance, vocals and instrumental music.  The school also offers wind symphony, concert band, stage band, brass ensembles, flute, clarinet and saxophone ensembles as well as string groups such as camerata and the red hot celli peppers. Wenona also has an orchestra.

The school runs a musical in both the senior and junior school which alternates with the Performing Arts Showcase every second year.  Musicals have included the Wizard of Oz, Footloose, Kiss Me Kate, Little Shop of Horrors, The Pajama Game, The Boyfriend, Guys and Dolls and Kismet as well as High School Musical.  Other concerts include an annual choral concert, ensemble concert, carol service, rock concert, elective music concerts and other events throughout the year.

Sport
Co-curricular sport is not compulsory at Wenona; however, students are encouraged to participate in competitive sport on Saturday mornings and at carnivals. Wenona teams participate in the competitions run by the Independent Primary School Heads of Australia (IPSHA) for primary students, and the Independent Girls' Schools Sporting Association (IGSSA) for those in the secondary school.

Sports offered to junior students (Years 4 to 6) through IPSHA include: Hockey/Minkey, Softball/Tee-ball/Modball, Netball, Tennis, Athletics, Swimming, Diving and Gymnastics. Primary girls may also compete in Skiing and Snowboarding through a separate interschool competition.

Through the IGSSA competition, secondary students may participate in: Rhythmic gymnastics, Artistic gymnastics, Athletics, Cricket, Cross country, Waterpolo, Diving, Swimming, Hockey, Tennis, Netball, and Softball. External to IGSSA, Wenona students may also participate in Equestrian, Indoor hockey, Indoor soccer, Fencing, skiing, and snowboarding and Touch football.

Notable alumnae

Alumnae of Woodstock/Wenona are known as Old Girls or Wenonians, and may choose to join the school's alumni association, the Wenonians Inc. Some notable Wenonians include:

Academic
 Beatrice Lilias Rennie – Headmistress and founder of Queenwood School for Girls
 Rebecca Elizabeth Scott – Rhodes Scholar (1993)
Entertainment, media and the arts
 Jacqueline McKenzie – multi-award-winning film, stage and television actress, artist and singer.
 Ann Moyal AM – Author; Biographer; Social Historian of Science, Telecommunication and Technology; Recipient of the Centenary Medal 2003 (also attended Canberra High School)
 Wendy Paramor – Artist
 April Rose Pengilly – Australian model, actress and daughter of INXS band member, Kirk Pengilly
 Rebecca Hetherington – Miss Rebecca from Mr. Squiggle
 Ashleigh Cummings – Actress
 Edwina McCann – Editor-in-chief of Vogue Australia

Medicine and the sciences
 Judith Dey – Pioneer in paediatrics including developmental disabilities
Shirley Jeffrey, marine biogist
 
Politics, public service and the law
 HE Dr Ruth Adler – Australian High Commissioner to Brunei Darussalam
 Hon. Justice Annabelle Claire Bennett AO (née Darin) – Judge of the Federal Court of Australia; Additional Judge of the Supreme Court of the Australian Capital Territory; Presidential Member of the Administrative Appeals Tribunal; Recipient of the Centenary Medal 2003
 Kate Obermayer – 2009 Australian Human Rights Award winner – Community Individual Kate Obermayer (née Locke) was recognised for increasing awareness and overcoming discrimination against deaf and hearing impaired people within Australia.

Sport
 Alexandra Green – Bronze medallist at paralympics
 Hannah Buckling- Water polo player

See also

 List of non-government schools in New South Wales
 List of boarding schools in Australia

References

External links
 Wenona School website

Educational institutions established in 1886
Boarding schools in New South Wales
Private secondary schools in Sydney
Girls' schools in New South Wales
Association of Heads of Independent Girls' Schools
Junior School Heads Association of Australia Member Schools
1886 establishments in Australia
North Sydney, New South Wales
Private primary schools in Sydney
Alliance of Girls' Schools Australasia